Amid an otherwise undistinguished decade, the Missouri Tigers baseball team won the Big 12 Conference Tournament in 2012. The team moved from the Big 12 Conference to the Eastern division of the Southeastern Conference in 2013. The Tigers struggled the first two seasons after the change of Conference, then improved to a limited extent.  their best performance during the decade in a Conference league was in 2015 (won 15 out of 30, 50.0%) and their best overall performance was in 2018 (won 25 out of 37, 67.6%). Tim Jamieson retired as head coach in 2016 after 22 years, to be replaced by Steve Bieser.

2010

Roster

Schedule

! style="background:black;color:#F1B82D;"| Regular Season
|- valign="top" 

|- bgcolor="#ffdddd"
| February 19 || vs.  || 6-10 || 0-1 || –
|- bgcolor="#ddffdd"
| February 20 || vs.  || 17-6 || 1-1 || –
|- bgcolor="#ddffdd"
| February 21 || vs.  || 2-1 || 2-1 || –
|- bgcolor="#ddffdd"
| February 26 || vs.  || 4-2 || 3-1 || –
|- bgcolor="#ddffdd"
| February 27 || at  || 11-7 || 4-1 || –
|- bgcolor="#ffdddd"
| February 28 || vs.  || 6-14 || 4-2 || –
|-

|- bgcolor="#ffdddd"
| March 5 || vs.  || 0-3 || 4-3 || –
|- bgcolor="#ffdddd"
| March 6 || vs. TCU || 3-4 || 4-4 || –
|- bgcolor="#ffdddd"
| March 7 || vs. Texas || 5-8 || 4-5 || –
|- bgcolor="#ddffdd"
| March 10 ||  || 10-3 || 5-5 || –
|- bgcolor="#ddffdd"
| March 12 ||  || 7-6 || 6-5 || –
|- bgcolor="#ddffdd"
| March 13 || Xavier || 4-2 || 7-5 || –
|- bgcolor="#ffdddd"
| March 14 || Xavier || 1-5 || 7-6 || –
|- bgcolor="#ddffdd"
| March 18 ||  || 17-5 || 8-6 || –
|- bgcolor="#ddffdd"
| March 19 || North Dakota || 7-3 || 9-6 || –
|- bgcolor="#ddffdd"
| March 20 || North Dakota || 6-0 || 10-6 || –
|- bgcolor="#ddffdd"
| March 23 ||  || 9-0 || 11-6 || –
|- bgcolor="#ddffdd"
| March 24 || Arkansas Pine Bluff || 28-2 || 12-6 || –
|- bgcolor="#ffdddd"
| March 26 || at  || 1-3 || 12-7 || 0-1
|- bgcolor="#ffdddd"
| March 27 || at Texas A&M || 4-5 || 12-8 || 0-2
|- bgcolor="#ddffdd"
| March 28 || at Texas A&M || 13-4 || 13-8 || 1-2
|- bgcolor="#ddffdd"
| March 30 ||  || 22-14 || 14-8 || –
|- bgcolor="#ffdddd"
| March 31 || Purdue || 3-6 || 14-9 || –
|-

|- bgcolor="#ffdddd"
| April 2 ||  || 6-20 || 14-10 || 1-3
|- bgcolor="#ffdddd"
| April 3 || Baylor || 3-7 || 14-11 || 1-4
|- bgcolor="#ddffdd"
| April 4 || Baylor || 13-9 || 15-11 || 2-4
|- bgcolor="#ddffdd"
| April 6 ||  || 14-3 || 16-11 || –
|- bgcolor="#ddffdd"
| April 7 || vs.  || 5-4 || 17-11 || –
|- bgcolor="#ffdddd"
| April 9 || at  || 4-6 || 17-12 || 2-5
|- bgcolor="#ffdddd"
| April 10 || at Oklahoma || 4-10 || 17-13 || 2-6
|- bgcolor="#ddffdd"
| April 11 || at Oklahoma || 12-11 || 18-13 || 3-6
|- bgcolor="#ffdddd"
| April 14 || at  || 4-5 || 18-14 || –
|- bgcolor="#ddffdd"
| April 16 ||  || 9-2 || 19-14 || 4-6
|- bgcolor="#ffdddd"
| April 17 || Oklahoma State || 7-10 || 19-15 || 4-7
|- bgcolor="#ffdddd"
| April 18 || Oklahoma State || 3-4 || 19-16 || 4-8
|- bgcolor="#ffdddd"
| April 21 || vs.  || 0-1 || 19-17 || –
|- bgcolor="#ddffdd"
| April 25 || Kansas State || 4-2 || 20-17 || 5-8
|- bgcolor="#ddffdd"
| April 25 || Kansas State || 9-8 || 21-17 || 6-8
|- bgcolor="#ddffdd"
| April 27 || vs.  || 10-2 || 22-17 || –
|- bgcolor="#ddffdd"
| April 30 || at  || 12-8 || 23-17 || 7-8
|-

|- bgcolor="#ffdddd"
| May 1 || at Texas Tech || 4-5 || 23-18 || 7-9
|- bgcolor="#ffdddd"
| May 2 || at Texas Tech || 15-16 || 23-19 || 7-10
|- bgcolor="#ddffdd"
| May 4 || Missouri State || 11-6 || 24-19 || –
|- bgcolor="#ffdddd"
| May 7 || at Kansas || 3-10 || 24-20 || 7–11
|- bgcolor="#ffdddd"
| May 8 || at Kansas || 8-9 || 24-21 || 7–12
|- bgcolor="#ffdddd"
| May 9 || at Kansas || 9-10 || 24-22 || 7–13
|- bgcolor="#ddffdd"
| May 14 ||  || 2-0 || 25-22 || 8–13
|- bgcolor="#ddffdd"
| May 15 || Nebraska || 12-7 || 26-22 || 9–13
|- bgcolor="#ddffdd"
| May 16 || Nebraska || 6-5 || 27-22 || 10–13
|- bgcolor="#ffdddd"
| May 21 || Texas || 2-5 || 27-23 || 10–14
|- bgcolor="#ffdddd"
| May 22 || Texas || 4-6 || 27-24 || 10–15
|- bgcolor="#ffdddd"
| May 23 || Texas || 11-20 || 27-25 || 10–16
|-

|-
! style="background:#F1B82D;color:black;"| Post-Season
|-

|- bgcolor="#ddffdd"
| May 26 || vs. Texas || Chickasaw Bricktown Ballpark || 7-3 || 28–25
|- bgcolor="#ffdddd"
| May 27 || vs. Texas A&M || Chickasaw Bricktown Ballpark || 2-7 || 28–26
|- bgcolor="#ffdddd"
| May 29 || vs. Texas Tech || Chickasaw Bricktown Ballpark || 7-3 || 29–26
|-

Tigers in the 2010 MLB Draft
The following members of the Missouri Tigers baseball program were drafted in the 2010 Major League Baseball Draft.

2011

2012

The Tigers won the Big 12 Tournament and went 1-2 in the Tucson Regional in the NCAA Tournament.

Roster

Schedule

! style="background:black;color:#F1B82D;"| Regular Season
|- valign="top" 

|- align="center" bgcolor="ffdddd"
| February 17 || at  || Plainsman Park || 2-5 || Anderson (L; 0-1) || 3,577 || 0-1 || –
|- align="center" bgcolor="#ddffdd"
| February 19 || at Auburn || Plainsman Park || 6–4 || Emens (W; 1-0) || 2,406 || 1–1 || –
|- align="center" bgcolor="#ddffdd"
| February 19 || at Auburn|| Plainsman Park || 4-3 || Ross (W; 1-0) || 2,598 || 2–1 || –
|- align="center" bgcolor="ffdddd"
| February 24 || at  || Benedetti Diamond || 1-3 || Anderson (L; 0-2)|| 147 || 2-2 || –
|- align="center" bgcolor="ffdddd"
| February 25 || at San Francisco || Benedetti Diamond || 1-3 || Zastryzny (L; 0-1) || 225 || 2-3 || –
|- align="center" bgcolor="ffdddd"
| February 26 || at San Francisco || Benedetti Diamond || 0-6 || Cline (L; 0-1) || 220 || 2-4 || –
|-

|- align="center" bgcolor="ffdddd"
| March 2 ||  || Taylor Stadium || 2-5 || Anderson (L; 0-3) || 524 || 2-5 || –
|- align="center" bgcolor="#ddffdd"
| March 3 || Ball State || Taylor Stadium || 15-5 || Zastryzny (W; 1-1) || 1,314 || 3-5 || –
|- align="center" bgcolor="#ddffdd"
| March 4 || Ball State || Taylor Stadium || 9-2 || Holovach (W; 1-0) || 1,249 || 4-5 || –
|- align="center" bgcolor="#ddffdd"
| March 6 ||  || Taylor Stadium || 14-4 || Graves (W; 1-0) || 543 || 5-5 || –
|- align="center" bgcolor="#ddffdd"
| March 9 ||  || Taylor Stadium || 10-4 || Emens (W; 2-0) || 539 || 6–5 || –
|- align="center" bgcolor="ddffdd"
| March 10 || Charlotte || Taylor Stadium || 5-3 || Zastryzny (W; 2-1) || 744 || 7-5 || –
|- align="center" bgcolor="ddffdd"
| March 10 || Charlotte || Taylor Stadium || 3–2 || Holovach (W; 2-0) || 744 || 8-5 || –
|- align="center" bgcolor="ddffdd"
| March 13 ||  || Taylor Stadium || 10-7 || Miles (W; 1-0) || 502 || 9-5 || –
|- align="center" bgcolor="ddffdd"
| March 13 || North Dakota || Taylor Stadium || 21-5 || Yuengel (W; 1-0) || 482 || 10-5 || –
|- align="center" bgcolor="ddffdd"
| March 16 ||   || Taylor Stadium || 8-7 || Walsh (W; 1-0) || 451 || 11–5 || –
|- align="center" bgcolor="ddffdd"
| March 17 || High Point || Taylor Stadium || 4–0 || Holovach (W; 3-0) || 434 || 12-5 || –
|- align="center" bgcolor="ffdddd"
| March 18 || High Point || Taylor Stadium || 7-13 || Platts (L; 0-1) || 4,088 || 12–6 || -
|- align="center" bgcolor="ffdddd"
| March 21 ||  || Taylor Stadium || 1-15 || Graves (L; 1-1) || 159 || 12-7 || –
|- align="center" bgcolor="ffdddd"
| March 24 ||  || Taylor Stadium || 2-3 || Walsh (L; 1-1) || 1,032|| 12–8 || 0–1
|- align="center" bgcolor="ddffdd"
| March 24 || Oklahoma State || Taylor Stadium || 4–1 || Holovach (W; 4-0) || 1,032 || 13–8 || 1–1
|- align="center" bgcolor="ddffdd"
| March 25 || Oklahoma State || Taylor Stadium || 4–2 || Emens (W; 3-0) || 1,072 || 14–8 || 2–1
|- align="center" bgcolor="ddffdd"
| March 27 ||  || Taylor Stadium || 12-7 || Barbeck (W; 1-0) || 383 || 15–8 || –
|- align="center" bgcolor="ffdddd"
| March 28 || Central Arkansas || Taylor Stadium || 2–8 || Graves (L; 1-2) || 370 || 15–9 || -
|- align="center" bgcolor="ffdddd"
| March 30 || at  || Olsen Field || 6-8 || Miles (L; 1-1) || 4,498 || 15–10 || 2-2
|- align="center" bgcolor="ddffdd"
| March 31 || at Texas A&M || Olsen Field || 4–3 || Holovach (W; 5-0) || 5,535 || 16–10 || 3–2
|-

|- align="center" bgcolor="ffdddd"
| April 1 || at Texas A&M || Olsen Field || 6–7 || Graves (L; 1-3) || 3,947 || 16–11 || 3–3
|- align="center" bgcolor="ffdddd"
| April 5 ||  || Taylor Stadium || 1-3 || Zastryzny (L; 2-2) || 486 || 16-12 || 3-4
|- align="center" bgcolor="ffdddd"
| April 6 || Baylor || Taylor Stadium || 3-5 || Holovach (L; 5-1) || 1,003 || 16-13 || 3–5
|- align="center" bgcolor="ffdddd"
| April 7 || Baylor || Taylor Stadium || 7–12 || Walsh (L; 1-2) || 677 || 16–14 || 3–6
|- align="center" bgcolor="ddffdd"
| April 10 ||  || Taylor Stadium || 10–5 || Walsh (W; 2-2) || 360 || 17–14 || –
|- align="center" bgcolor="ddffdd"
| April 11 ||  || Busch Stadium || 5-4 || Graves (W; 2-3) || 1,399 || 18–14 || –
|- align="center" bgcolor="ffdddd"
| April 13 || at  || Mitchell Park || 5-6 || Emens (L; 3-1) || 622 || 18–15 || 3–7
|- align="center" bgcolor="ffdddd"
| April 14 || at Oklahoma || Mitchell Park || 4-8 || Holovach (L; 5-2) || 1,146 || 18–16 || 3–8
|- align="center" bgcolor="ffdddd"
| April 15 || at Oklahoma || Mitchell Park || 4-5 || Graves (L; 2-4) || 930 || 18–17 || 3–9
|- align="center" bgcolor="ddffdd"
| April 20 ||  || Taylor Stadium || 13-4 || Zastryzny (W; 3-2) || 584 || 19–17 || 4–9
|- align="center" bgcolor="ddffdd"
| April 21 || Kansas State || Taylor Stadium || 4–3 || Ross (W; 2-0) || 2,049 || 20–17 || 5–9
|- align="center" bgcolor="ddffdd"
| April 22 || Kansas State || Taylor Stadium || 7–0 || Graves (W; 3-4) || 752 || 21–17 || 6–9
|- align="center" bgcolor="ddffdd"
| April 25 || at  || Hammons Field || 4–3 || Miles (W; 2-1) || 2,540 || 22-17 || –
|- align="center" bgcolor="ddffdd"
| April 27 || at Texas Tech || Dan Law Field || 9–0 || Zastryzny (W; 4-2) || 2,856 || 23–17 || 7-9
|- align="center" bgcolor="ffdddd"
| April 28 || at Texas Tech || Dan Law Field || 3–4 || Holovach (L; 5-3) || 3,224 || 23-18 || 7–10
|- align="center" bgcolor="ffdddd"
| April 29 || at Texas Tech || Dan Law Field || 0-7 || Graves (L; 3-5) || 3,018 || 23–19 || 8–10
|-

|- align="center" bgcolor="ffdddd"
| May 1 || at Arkansas || Baum Stadium || 3–6 || Holovach (L; 5-4) || 7,051 || 23–20 || -
|- align="center" bgcolor="ffdddd"
| May 2 || at Arkansas || Baum Stadium || 0-2 || Walsh (L; 2-3) || 6,840 || 23–21 || -
|- align="center" bgcolor="ffdddd"
| May 4 || Texas || Taylor Stadium || 4-6 || Zastryzny (L; 4-3) || 1,387 || 23–22 || 8-11
|- align="center" bgcolor="ddffdd"
| May 5 || Texas || Taylor Stadium || 5-4 || Ross (W; 3-0) || 2,210 || 24–22 || 8-12
|- align="center" bgcolor="ddffdd"
| May 6 || Texas || Taylor Stadium || 7-6 || Graves (W; 4-5) || 1,140 || 25–22 || 9-12
|- align="center" bgcolor="ddffdd"
| May 9 || Missouri State || Taylor Stadium || 10-5 || Yuengel (W; 2-0) || 1,004 || 26–22 || -
|- align="center" bgcolor="ffdddd"
| May 11 ||  || Taylor Stadium || 4–6 || Zastryzny (L; 4-4) || 886 || 26–23 || –
|- align="center" bgcolor="ddffdd"
| May 12 || Memphis || Taylor Stadium || 9–1 || Miles (W; 3-1 || 779 || 27–23 || –
|- align="center" bgcolor="ffdddd"
| May 13 || Memphis || Taylor Stadium || 7–8 || Ross (L; 3-1) || 3,299 || 27–24 || –
|- align="center" bgcolor="ffdddd"
| May 17 ||  || Taylor Stadium || 0–1 || Zastryzny (L; 4-5) || 1,209 || 27–25 || 9–13
|- align="center" bgcolor="ffdddd"
| May 18 || Kansas || Taylor Stadium || 3–6 || Miles (L; 3-2) || 1,510  || 27–26 || 9–14
|- align="center" bgcolor="ddffdd"
| May 18 || Kansas || Taylor Stadium || 6–3 || Holovach (W; 6-4) || 1,536  || 28–26 || 10–14
|-

|-
! style="background:#F1B82D;color:black;"| Post-Season
|-

|- align="center" bgcolor="ddffdd"
| May 23 || vs. Texas || Chickasaw Bricktown Ballpark || 5–0 || Zastryzny (W; 5-5) || 3,853 || 29–26
|- align="center" bgcolor="ddffdd"
| May 24 || vs. Texas A&M || Chickasaw Bricktown Ballpark || 5–3 || Holovach (W; 7-4) || 4,285 || 30–26
|- align="center" bgcolor="ddffdd"
| May 26 || vs. Kansas || Chickasaw Bricktown Ballpark || 12–2 || Emens (W; 4-1) || 5,299 || 31–26
|- align="center" bgcolor="ddffdd"
| May 23 || vs. Oklahoma || Chickasaw Bricktown Ballpark || 8–7 || Ross W; 4-1) || 6,343 || 32–26
|-

|- align="center" bgcolor="ffdddd"
| June 1 || vs. Arizona || Hi Corbett Field || 3–15 || Holovach (L; 7-5)|| 5,086 || 32–27
|- align="center" bgcolor="ddffdd"
| June 2 || vs.  || Hi Corbett Field || 6–2 || Emens (W; 5-1) || 451 || 33–27
|- align="center" bgcolor="ffdddd"
| June 3 || vs.  || Hi Corbett Field || 3–11 || Ross (L; 4-2) || 1,430 || 33–28
|-

Awards and honors
Blake Brown
All-Big 12 Honorable Mention 
All-Big 12 Tournament Team

Jeff Emens
All-Big 12 Tournament Team

Eric Garcia
Big 12 Tournament Most Outstanding Player

Blake Holovach
Big 12 Newcomer of the Week (3/26)

John Miles
Big 12 Newcomer of the Week (5/7)

Dane Opel
All-Big 12 Honorable Mention 
All-Big 12 Tournament Team
Big 12 Player of the Week (2/20)

Dusty Ross
All-Big 12 Second Team

Ben Turner
All-Big 12 Honorable Mention

Rob Zastryzny
All-Big 12 Honorable Mention
Big 12 Pitcher of the Week (4/30)

Tigers in the 2012 MLB Draft
The following members of the Missouri Tigers baseball program were drafted in the 2012 Major League Baseball Draft.

2013

2014

2015

2016

Record vs. conference opponents

2017

Roster

Record vs. conference opponents

2018

Record vs. conference opponents

2019

References

Missouri Tigers baseball seasons